Golfingiidae is a family of peanut worms.

Species

Golfingia
 Golfingia anderssoni (Théel, 1911)
 Golfingia birsteini Murina 1973
 Golfingia capensis (Teuscher, 1874)
 Golfingia elongata (Keferstein, 1862)
 Golfingia iniqua (Sluiter, 1912)
 Golfingia margaritacea (Sars, 1851)
 Golfingia mirabilis Murina 1969
 Golfingia muricaudata (Southern, 1913)
 Golfingia pectinatoides Cutler and Cutler, 1979
 Golfingia vulgaris (de Blainville, 1827)

Nephasoma
 Nephasoma abyssorum (Koren and Danielssen, 1875)
 Nephasoma bulbosum (Southern, 1913)
 Nephasoma capilleforme (Murina, 1973)
 Nephasoma confusum (Sluiter, 1902)
 Nephasoma constricticervix (Cutler, 1969)
 Nephasoma constrictum (Southern, 1913)
 Nephasoma cutleri (Murina, 1975)
 Nephasoma diaphanes (Gerould, 1913)
 Nephasoma eremita (Sars, 1851)
 Nephasoma filiforme (Sluiter, 1902)
 Nephasoma flagriferum (Selenka, 1885)
 Nephasoma laetmophilum (Fisher, 1952)
 Nephasoma lilljeborgi (Danielssen & Koren, 1880)
 Nephasoma minutum (Keferstein, 1862)
 Nephasoma multiaraneusa (Murina, 1967)
 Nephasoma novaezealandiae (Bendham, 1904)
 Nephasoma pellucidum (Keferstein, 1865)
 Nephasoma rimicola (Gibbs, 1973)
 Nephasoma rutilofuscum (Fisher, 1947)
 Nephasoma schuettei (Augener, 1903)
 Nephasoma tasmaniense (Murina, 1964)
 Nephasoma vitjazi (Murina, 1964)
 Nephasoma wodjanizkii (Murina, 1973)

Thysanocardia
 Thysanocardia catharinae (Grübe, 1868)
 Thysanocardia nigra (Ikeda, 1904)
 Thysanocardia procera (Möbius, 1875)

References

Sipunculans
Annelid families